Chow Tin Tsuen is a village in the Ta Kwu Ling area of North District, Hong Kong.

History
Chow Tin Tsuen was first inhabited in the 17th century by the members of the To clan, who were Hakka from Dongguan in Guangdong province. The village was later settled by members of the Siu and Ho clans in the late 19th century.

References

External links
 Delineation of area of existing village Chow Tin Tsuen (Ta Kwu Ling) for election of resident representative (2019 to 2022)
 Antiquities Advisory Board. Pictures of No. 80 Chow Tin Tsuen, Ta Kwu Ling

North District, Hong Kong

Villages in North District, Hong Kong